Nayband Wildlife Sanctuary, Naybandan Wildlife Refuge or Nayband National Park is a National Park in Iran. It has recently been given legal protection, and was known to have held the highest population of Asiatic cheetahs. Since 2006, it was estimated that at least 15 cheetahs live there.

Topography 
The sanctuary has various topographic areas like mountains, plains, sand plains, hilly desert plains, and water with different taste from the most salty water to the freshest water.

Fauna 
Mammals like Asiatic cheetahs, Persian leopard, caracal, wild goat, jebeer gazelle, wild sheep, mouflon, ibex, Blanford's fox, Rüppell's fox, and exotic and valuable birds like bustard, cuckoo, Pleske's ground jay, and other birds such as partridge, crao, hoopoe, lark, horned lark, different types of owls, eagles, vultures. Reptilians include the Jafari snake, viper, camel snake, asp, horned asp, gecko and lizard. Rodents include rats and porcupines. Insect-eaters include the hedgehog and bat.

See also 
 Khar Turan National Park
 Wildlife of Iran

References

External links 
 Information to Asiatic cheetah at wildlifeextra.com
 Nayband Wildlife Sanctuary on wikimapia

National parks of Iran
Geography of South Khorasan Province